Lois Kathryn Herr (born December 23, 1941) is a progressive activist living in Pennsylvania. While working at AT&T she was leader fighting for equal rights for women in the workplace. A Democrat, she ran for U.S. Representative from Pennsylvania's 16th congressional district in 2004, 2006 and 2010. In 2013, she was elected to the Borough Council of Mount Gretna, Pennsylvania, and took office in 2014.

Early life and education and career
Herr was born in Hershey, Pennsylvania. She graduated from Elizabethtown College in Pennsylvania, received a master's degree from the University of Pennsylvania, and an MBA from Fordham University.

Herr's first full-time job, in 1963, was as a seventh grade English teacher in Middletown Township, New Jersey. The following year she began working at Bell Laboratories. She held various senior management positions with NYNEX, AT&T, New York Telephone and Bell Laboratories through 1990, working in line operations, sales and marketing, government relations, corporate planning and finance. She gradually became aware that women at AT&T did not receive the same benefits as men, and that there were some jobs which were closed to women. Following a 1970 sex discrimination suit by the Equal Employment Opportunity Commission, Herr and other women at AT&T worked within the corporation for equal rights for women. AT&T settled the suit in 1973.

She also served as a Presidential Interexchange Executive, working under President Gerald Ford in the White House Office of Management and Budget. Herr has been scholar-in-residence at Elizabethtown College, taught in their Business Department and Center for Continuing Education and also served as Director of Marketing and Public Affairs. Herr has served on several boards, including Conestoga Financial Corporation, the Pennsylvania State Board of Barber Examiners, Elizabethtown College, Penn Laurel Girl Scout Council, the Greystone Manor Therapeutic Riding Center and the Veteran Feminists of America.

Publications
Herr's first book, Women, Power and AT&T: Winning Rights in the Workplace, was published in 2002 by Northeastern University Press. According to WorldCat, it is held in 488 libraries. It was reprinted by URLink in 2020. Her second book, Dear Coach: Letters Home from World War II, was published in 2009, based on over 200 letters sent to her father, Coach Ira Herr, from men and women serving in the war. A third book, Dear Woman of My Dreams, was published by XLIBRIS in 2016.

Political career
Herr previously served as the Executive Director of the Lancaster County Democratic Committee and was both a local and a state committeeperson in the Pennsylvania Democratic Party. She served also as Chair of the Lebanon County Democratic Committee and a member of the National Organization for Women.

Political campaigns

Herr ran for the US Congressional seat held by Republican Joseph R. Pitts in 2004, 2006 and 2010. She was defeated in each election by the incumbent.

Electoral history

In 2013, Herr was elected to the Mount Gretna Borough Council as a nominee of the Democratic Party. Herr received 57 votes, defeating Republican nominee Angela Shea, who had 32 votes.

In 2018, Herr was the Democratic nominee for state senator in Pennsylvania's 48th legislative district and lost to incumbent Republican Mike Folmer.

Personal life
Herr is a native of Hershey, Pennsylvania and currently resides in Mount Gretna.

Works
Lois Kathryn Herr, Women, Power and AT&T: Winning Rights in the Workplace, Northeastern (December 12, 2002), 
Lois Kathryn Herr, Dear Coach: Letters Home from World War II, (August 10, 2009),

References

External links
 
Campaign contributions at OpenSecrets.org
Dear Coach official book site
Lois K. Herr papers at Hagley Museum and Library
Oral History at https://www.veteranfeministsofamerica.org

Living people
1941 births
Elizabethtown College alumni
People from Hershey, Pennsylvania
Pennsylvania Democrats
American women's rights activists
Activists from Pennsylvania
Candidates in the 2004 United States elections
Candidates in the 2006 United States elections
Candidates in the 2010 United States elections
Pennsylvania local politicians
Women in Pennsylvania politics
21st-century American politicians
American United Methodists
21st-century American women politicians